Intersec, the Journal of International Security is a specialised international magazine founded in Surrey in 1991. It is published by Albany Media Ltd, based in London 10 times a year, and is available in paper form by subscription or select circulation to readers with an interest in international security and counter terrorism.

Intersec magazine defines itself as a "leading monthly journal of international security", and its coverage includes all aspects of risk and security threats and response. The magazine seeks to provide comprehensive and accessible insights into the world of international security, including analysis of country-specific, regional and international security threats as well as discussion of developments in security policy, strategy, tactics and technology. It also covers police counter-terrorism efforts, and emergency response to terrorist attacks.  The content of the magazine targets security practitioners and policymakers, and therefore features articles by specialist journalists and industry professionals. As of July 2011 some sections of the magazine can also be accessed online.

References

External links
 Intersec

1991 establishments in England
International relations journals
Magazines established in 1991
Magazines published in London
Mass media in Surrey
Political science journals
Ten times annually magazines